Soukourougban is a village in northwestern Ivory Coast. It is in the sub-prefecture of Kounahiri, Kounahiri Department, Béré Region, Woroba District. It lies along the A8 road, connected to Séguéla in the west and Bouaké in the east.

Soukourougban was a commune until March 2012, when it became one of 1126 communes nationwide that were abolished.

Notes

Former communes of Ivory Coast
Populated places in Woroba District
Populated places in Béré Region